The Private International Law (Implementation of Agreements) Act 2020 puts gives primary legislative effect to the  1996, 2005 and 2007 Hauge Conventions as signed at The Hague. Section 2 of the Act allows the Government to implement other international agreements relating to private international law through secondary legislation.

It received royal assent on 14 December 2020.

References 

United Kingdom Acts of Parliament 2020
2020 in British law
2020 in British politics
International law